Maghrebi Arabs ( al-‘Arab al-Maghariba) or North African Arabs ( ‘Arab Shamal Ifriqiya) are the inhabitants of the North African Maghreb region whose native language is Arabic and identify as Arab. This ethnic identity is a product of the Arab conquest of North Africa during the Arab–Byzantine wars and the spread of Islam to Africa. The migration of Arabs to North Africa in the 11th century was a major factor in the ethnical, linguistic and cultural Arabization of the Maghreb region.
The descendants of the original Arab settlers who continue to speak Arabic as a first language currently form the single largest population group in North Africa.

Traditions

Morocco
Moroccan women traditionally wear copious amounts of jewelry on their neck, arms, head and ears. Preferably, the jewelry should be made from pure gold as this signifies that the family is economically well-off. The jewelry tends to be decorated with different jewels like rubies, olivines, Andalucian beads, pearls and diamonds. The olivines and the pearls are traditionally used in most Maghrebi jewelry. The olivine represents female beauty, and was historically associated with the pre-Islamic goddesses of the Arabian pantheon. The pearls used in the jewelry represent wealth and fortune.

Weddings
Brides in Morocco adorn themselves in extensive amounts of jewelry, the amount of jewelry depends on the economic status of the family. Different regions in Morocco have different types of traditional jewelry. Brides in the region of Tanger-Tetouan add pearls to their traditional jewelry, whereas brides in the region of Fes add pheridot jewels and gold. In the Sahara, gold and coloured beads are added to the outfit. Families that can't afford to buy jewelry rent it for the occasion.

The headdresses used in the ceremony also tend to differ depending on the region. The northern region of Morocco, (Tanger-Tetouan), use a striped and glittery fabric to cover the bride's head. A headpiece in either silver or gold (depending on the region) is placed over the fabrics and is sometimes decorated with jewels. In the central region, Fes-Meknes, a decorated dark green and golden fabric is used, over it a golden headpiece is placed, decorated with dark green pheridot jewels and pearls hanging down over the face. In the southern region, Western Sahara, the women wear a headpiece decorated with gold pieces and coloured beads that differ from tribe to tribe. The bride's head is covered with a black fabric.

Cuisine

Morocco 
 Tharid
 Chermoula
harira
Pastilla
Rfissa
Tangia
Djaj mhameer
Seffa
Mechoui
Couscous

Algeria 
 Shorba
Chakchoukha

Hem Ahlo

Tunisia 
 Assidat Zgougou
 Brik
 Fricasse
 Harissa
 Lablabi

Libya 
 Basin
 Sharba
 couscous belbuslah
 Ftàt 
 Ousban
 psisa

List of tribes

Morocco
 Azwafit, a tribe of Bedouin Arab origin, part of the greater Tekna confederation. Historically the tribe would escort and protect caravans for the payment of a fee known as "Ztata" or "Zfata", whence the name Azwafit. Because they became part of a bigger Berber tribe, the Arab sub-tribes are partially Berberised and speak Berber today. The writer La Chapelle noted that Azwafits counted the following five branches: Ait Ahmed Ou Ali, Ahl Hayin, Mhamd Ait Ait El Khennous, Ait Messaoud Ait Boukko and Ida Ou Louggan.
 Ahl Rachida, an Arab tribe, also referred to as Ouled Sidi Yaakoub. The tribe can trace its lineage to the Islamic prophet Muhammad through his grandson, Hasan ibn Ali.
 Hyayna
 Hamyane
 Rhamna
 Abda, an Arab tribe whose origin dates back to the arrival of the Beni Maqil tribe at the end of the Merinid era. Historian Eugene Aubin wrote: "The Abda are a powerful tribe, consisting of thirty-thousand cind lights, Arab purment race, they occupy a fertile territory, rich in horses and cattle. It is one of five quasi-Makhzen tribes of Morocco." It consists of three branches, Bhatra, Rabiaa and Ouled Amer.
 Beni Ahsen, an Arab-Moroccan tribe, part of Beni Maqil. They settled in the Missour and Almis area around the 16th century, and migrated northwest of the Sefrou region in the 17th century. In the 18th century they were pushed west by the Zemmour tribe, which had migrated north from the south. Today they are located in the region of Rabat and the Atlantic coast.
 Beni Amir
 Beni Guil, an Arab tribe that can trace its lineage to the prophet's grandson, Hasan ibn Ali. In the 10th century their ancestors were given the right to graze in eastern and western Morocco by the Fatimid ruler Al-Mu'izz li-Din Allah.
 Beni Mathar
 Beni Hassan
 Maqil
 Beni Khirane
 Beni Zemmour

See also
Arab world
Arab-Berber
Moroccans
Algerian people
Maghreb
Maghrebis

References

Arabs in Morocco
Arabs in Algeria
Arabs in Tunisia
Arabs in Libya
Andalusia
Tribes of Africa
Tribes of Arabia
Arabs
Arabs in North Africa
Arab groups
Maghreb
Ethnic groups in North Africa